East Montpelier is a census-designated place (CDP) comprising the central village of the town of East Montpelier, Washington County, Vermont, United States. The population of the CDP was 80 at the 2010 census.

Geography
Vermont Route 14 also passes through the village, leading north to Hardwick and south to Barre.

East Montpelier is located on the north bank of the Winooski River.

References

Census-designated places in Vermont
Census-designated places in Washington County, Vermont